Hideki Okada (born 28 November 1958) is a Japanese former racing driver.

Japanese Formula 3000 Championship/Formula Nippon results
(key) (Races in bold indicate pole position) (Races in italics indicate fastest lap)

Japanese Touring Car Championship (-1993) Class results

Japanese Touring Car Championship (1994-) results

References

1958 births
Living people
Japanese racing drivers
Japanese Formula 3000 Championship drivers
24 Hours of Le Mans drivers
World Sportscar Championship drivers

Long Distance Series drivers
Japanese Touring Car Championship drivers
Mugen Motorsports drivers
Nakajima Racing drivers
Japanese Sportscar Championship drivers
Team LeMans drivers
Sauber Motorsport drivers